Između dva zla is a three-part live album by the Serbian alternative rock band Block Out, recorded in 1999, and released in 2001. The first, the second and the partially the third part were recorded live at the Belgrade SKC, on September 11, 1999. The volume 3 of the album was released only on the compact cassette edition of the album.

Volume 1 
Između dva zla vol. 1 (Between Two Evils Volume 1) is the first part of the second live album by the Serbian alternative rock band Block Out, recorded in 1999, and released in 2001.

Track listing 
All tracks written by Nikola Vranjković.  
 "Tri korne penal" (10:06)
 "Rođendanska" (5:01)
 "Nedostupna polja" (6:12)
 "Raskorak" (7:34)
 "Zvezdane staze" (2:38)
 "San koji srećan sanjaš sam" (4:34)
 "Trenje" (9:36)
 "Zečevi beli" (5:43)
 "Čarobni akord" (4:26)
 "Finansijska konstrukcija" (5:07)
 "Deponija" (9:27)

Volume 2 
Između dva zla vol. 2 (Between Two Evils Volume 2) is the second part of the second live album by the Serbian alternative rock band Block Out, recorded in 1999, and released in 2001.

Track listing 
All tracks written by Nikola Vranjković.  
 "Kad hodam" (4:29)
 "Devojko mala" (3:12)
 "Vertikalno gledano" (6:50)
 "Poštar" (3:45)
 "Sekira" (6:23)
 "Protiv sebe" (5:00)
 "Sudopera" (3:25)
 "Manastir" (3:05)
 "Blentostamin" (6:14)
 "SDSS" (5:42)
 "Koma" (10:37)

Volume 3 
Između dva zla vol. 3 (Between Two Evils Volume 3) is the third part of the second live album by the Serbian alternative rock band Block Out, recorded in 1999, and released in 2001. The album was released only on compact cassette, and featured recordings from Belgrade, Niš, and Zrenjanin.

Track listing 
All tracks written by Nikola Vranjković.
 "Kad hodam" (4:29)
 "Devojko mala (Ja ne želim da odeš)" (3:12)
 "Vertikalno gledano" (6:50)
 "Koma" (10:35)
 "Leto na Adi" (8:59)
 "Elektroliza" (3:40)
 "Neki moji drugovi" (12:24)

Personnel 
 Aleksandar Balać (bass)
 Miljko Radonjić (drums)
 Nikola Vranjković (guitar, vocals, music by, lyrics by)
 Dragoljub Marković (keyboards, vocals)
 Milutin Jovančić (vocals, artwork by [design])

Additional personnel 
 Ivan Brusić (engineer [postproduction], mastered by)
 Aleksandar Radosavljević (mixed by)
 Grujica Bibin (photography)
 Danilo Pavićević (recorded by)
 Milan Barković (recorded by)

External links 
 EX YU ROCK enciklopedija 1960-2006, Janjatović Petar; 
 Između dva zla vol.1 at Discogs
 Između dva zla vol.2 at Discogs
 Između dva zla vol.1, vol. 2, vol. 3 at the official website

Block Out (band) live albums
Live album series
1999 live albums
Metropolis Records (Serbia) live albums